Eric J. Christensen (born 1977) is an American astronomer and a discoverer of comets. He works as a staff scientist with Catalina Sky Survey and is responsible for the survey's near-Earth object operation.

Career 
Christensen is the director of the Catalina Sky Survey (CSS), which is funded by NASA and based at the Lunar and Planetary Laboratory of the University of Arizona in Tucson. Christensen is the director of the survey's near-Earth object (NEO) operations, including observing, software development, cadence optimization, telescope and instrument maintenance and collimation, survey modeling and optimization, and project management. He has also spent 5 years at Gemini South Observatory in Chile as part of the science operations team, including hunting for meteorites in the Atacama Desert.

Discoveries 

 Numbered comets

 164P/Christensen
 170P/Christensen
 210P/Christensen
 266P/Christensen
 286P/Christensen
 287P/Christensen
 298P/Christensen
 316P/LONEOS-Christensen
 383P/Christensen

 Unnumbered comets

 C/2005 B1 (Christensen)
 C/2005 O2 (Christensen)
 P/2005 T2 (Christensen)
 C/2005 W2 (Christensen)
 C/2006 F2 (Christensen)
 P/2006 S4 (Christensen)
 C/2006 W3 (Christensen)
 P/2006 WY182 (Christensen)
 C/2006 YC (Catalina–Christensen)
 P/2007 B1 (Christensen)
 C/2013 K1 (Christensen)
 C/2014 H1 (Christensen)
 C/2014 M2 (Christensen)
 C/2014 W7 (Christensen)
 P/2016 A2 (Christensen)
 P/2022 E1 (Christensen)

Awards and honors 
Asteroid 13858 Ericchristensen, discovered by the Catalina Sky Survey in 1999, was named in his honor. The official  was published by the Minor Planet Center on 22 July 2013.

References

External links 
 A Little Comet Named Christensen,  David H. Levy, 8 June 2009
 Eric Christensen, University of Arizona
 Four Comets in Two Days – Comet Christensen (210P/Christensen  P/2003 K2), Solar and Heliospheric Observatory, 26 January 2018
 Comets discovered in 2007, BAA Comet Section

1977 births
American astronomers
Discoverers of comets

Living people